German submarine U-522 was a Type IXC U-boat of Nazi Germany's Kriegsmarine during World War II.

She was laid down at the Deutsche Werft (yard) in Hamburg as yard number 337 on 9 July 1941, launched on 1 April 1942 and commissioned on 11 June with Kapitänleutnant Herbert Schneider in command.

U-522 began her service career with training as part of the 4th U-boat Flotilla from 11 June 1942. She was reassigned to the 2nd flotilla for operations on 1 October 1942.

She carried out two patrols and sank seven ships. She damaged two more. She was sunk on 23 February 1943 in mid-Atlantic west of Madeira by a British warship.

Design
German Type IXC submarines were slightly larger than the original Type IXBs. U-522 had a displacement of  when at the surface and  while submerged. She had two shafts and two  propellers.

U-522 was fitted with six  torpedo tubes (four fitted at the bow and two at the stern), 22 torpedoes, one  SK C/32 naval gun, 180 rounds, and a  SK C/30 as well as a  C/30 anti-aircraft gun. The boat had a complement of forty-eight.

Service history

First patrol
The boat departed Kiel on 8 October 1942, moved through the North Sea, negotiated the gap between Iceland and the Faroe Islands and entered the Atlantic Ocean.

She entered Lorient, on the French Atlantic coast, on 2 December 1942.

Second patrol and loss
U-522s second foray took her to the mid-Atlantic once again. Two days later, she damaged the British Dominion "northeast of the Canary Islands".

She was sunk west of Madeira on 23 February 1943 by depth charges dropped by the sloop (ex-US Coast Guard Cutter) .

Fifty-one men died; there were no survivors.

Wolfpacks
U-522 took part in two wolfpacks, namely:
 Kreuzotter (8 – 22 November 1942)
 Delphin (3 January – 14 February 1943)

Summary of raiding history

References

Bibliography

External links

German Type IX submarines
U-boats commissioned in 1942
U-boats sunk in 1943
U-boats sunk by British warships
World War II submarines of Germany
1942 ships
World War II shipwrecks in the Atlantic Ocean
Ships built in Hamburg
Ships lost with all hands
Maritime incidents in February 1943